Elmer and the Dragon is the second in the My Father's Dragon trilogy of children's novels by Ruth Stiles Gannett. It is preceded by My Father's Dragon and followed by The Dragons of Blueland. In this book, Elmer Elevator and his recently liberated dragon friend travel home, but find themselves marooned on another island inhabited by talkative animals. The illustrations within the book are black and white lithographs, done by the author's stepmother, Ruth Chrisman Gannett.

Plot summary
Elmer and the dragon (Boris, we learn in book 3) are stranded on a remote island inhabited only by canaries. One of them, Flute, was Elmer's pet until he escaped to Feather Island. Elmer helps Flute and the king and queen canaries to dig up a chest that the island's former human settlers left. Inside are various household items, a watch, a harmonica, and six bags of gold. The dragon flies Elmer back to his house before returning to Blueland, his own home.

See also

Elmer's Adventure: My Father's Dragon

References

1950 American novels
1950 children's books
Children's fantasy novels
American children's novels
Books about dragons
Novels set on fictional islands